Équipe Andrée Champoux pour Verdun (EAC) (English: Team Andrée Champoux for Verdun) was a municipal political party in Montreal, Quebec, Canada. The party contested seats on the Verdun borough council in the 2013 Montreal municipal election.

Party leader
As its name implies, EAC was led by Andrée Champoux, who was also its candidate for borough mayor in 2013. Champoux had previously been elected as a borough councillor for Champlain–L'Île-des-Sœurs in the 2009 Montreal municipal election as a candidate of Union Montreal. She left the party on December 4, 2012, after its leader, Gérald Tremblay, resigned from office amid scandal.

When Verdun borough mayor Claude Trudel also resigned from office in the same period, Champoux put forward her name to become his interim successor. She was defeated by city councillor Ginette Marotte in a four-to-two vote among the remaining borough council members.

2013 election
After serving for several months as an independent, Champoux formed EAC in 2013. The party's campaign slogan in that year's municipal election was «citoyens d'abord» (English: "citizens first"). During the campaign, Champoux outlined her party's approaches to subjects such as public transit on Nuns' Island and poverty reduction.

She was defeated in the mayoral contest, and none of the EAC's candidates for city council and borough council were elected.

The party was dissolved and ceased to be recognized by the Directeur général des élections du Québec on July 17, 2014.

Election results

References

Municipal political parties in Montreal
2013 establishments in Quebec
Political parties established in 2013